Koro is a town in northwest Ivory Coast. It is a sub-prefecture of and the seat of Koro Department in Bafing Region, Woroba District. Koro is also a commune.

In 2014, the population of the sub-prefecture of Koro was 23,596.

Villages
The seventeen villages of the sub-prefecture of Koro and their population in 2014 are:

Notes

Sub-prefectures of Bafing Region
Communes of Bafing Region